Thomas "Tom" Dibella (November 29, 1905 - June 6, 1988) was an American mobster and one-time acting boss of the Colombo crime family.

References 

Colombo crime family
American gangsters of Italian descent
People from Brooklyn
1905 births
1988 deaths
American crime bosses
Bosses of the Colombo crime family
Acting bosses of the Five Families